Amos Kidder Fiske (May 12, 1842, Whitefield, New Hampshire — September 18, 1921, Cambridge, Massachusetts) was an American lawyer, journalist, and the author of several books. He was an editorial writer for The New York Times for 22 years.

Biography
During his childhood in New Hampshire, he worked both on his parents’ farm and in a nearby village as a factory hand at a cotton-mill. Orphaned at age sixteen, he continued his employment at the cotton-mill and saved enough money for his further education. After secondary education at Appleton Academy in New Ipswich, New Hampshire, he matriculated in 1862 at Harvard University, where he worked part-time to support himself. At Harvard, Fiske graduated with an A.B. in 1866. After graduatiion he went to New York City, where he taught school for the academic year 1866–1867 and then studied law for a year. One of the lawyers at the law office where he studied was George Ticknor Curtis. Fiske helped Curtis considerably in writing Curtis's biography of Daniel Webster, but was not mentioned in the biography's preface. Fiske was admitted to the New York state bar in 1868.

Fiske returned in 1868 to Cambridge and graduated in 1869 with an A.M. from Harvard. In Cambridge, Massachusetts, on October 27, 1870, he married Caroline Child (1837–1915), sister of Francis James Child.

Amos Fiske preferred journalism to the practice of law. He started as a reporter and worked his way to promotions as night copy editor, book reviewer, and, finally, to editorial writer. He was employed on the staff of the New York Times from 1869 to 1871 and from 1878 to 1897. He was an editor for the Boston Globe from 1874 to 1877. From 1900 to 1902 he was employed by New York's The Mail and Express. From 1902 to 1919 he was an associate editor for the Journal of Commerce and Commercial Bulletin. He made many contributions to the American Cyclopædia and the Annual Cyclopedia, as well as occasional contributions to Harper's Weekly.

He was a member of the Century Association, where he enjoyed the reading room and playing pool.

Amos and Caroline Fiske had a son and two daughters. Their son, Philip Sidney Fiske (1872–1928), was educated at Harvard. Their two daughters were educated at Radcliffe.

Selected publications

Articles

Books

References

External links
 

1842 births
1921 deaths
Harvard University alumni
The New York Times editors
The New York Times writers
19th-century American journalists
20th-century American journalists
People from Whitefield, New Hampshire